Hung Ga, Hung Kuen, or Hung Ga Kuen is a southern Chinese martial art belonging to the southern Shaolin styles. The hallmarks of Hung Ga are strong stances, notably the horse stance, or "si ping ma", and strong hand techniques, notably the bridge hand and the versatile tiger claw. Traditionally, students spent anywhere from several months to three years in stance training, often sitting only in horse stance from half an hour to several hours at a time, before learning any forms. Each form could then take a year or so to learn, with weapons learned last. In current times, this mode of instruction is generally considered impractical for students, who have other concerns beyond practicing kung fu.  However, some instructors still follow traditional guidelines and make stance training the majority of their beginner training. Hung Ga is sometimes mischaracterized as solely external—that is, reliant on brute physical force rather than the cultivation of qi—even though the student advances progressively toward an internal focus.

Historical origins

Hung Ga's earliest beginnings have been traced to the 17th century in southern China. More specifically, legend has it that a Shaolin monk, Jee Sin Sim See (”sim see” = zen teacher) was at the heart of Hung Ga's emergence.  Jee Sin Sim See was alive during a time of fighting in the Qing Dynasty. He practiced the arts during an era when the Shaolin Temple had become a refuge for those that opposed the ruling class (the Manchus), allowing him to practice in semi-secrecy. When the Shaolin temple was burned down, many fled to the Southern affiliated Shaolin temple in the Fukien Province of Southern China along with him. There it is believed Jee Sin Sim See trained several people, including non-Buddhist monks, also called Shaolin Layman Disciples, in the art of Shaolin Kung Fu.

Of course, Jee Sin Sim See was hardly the only person of significance that had fled to the temple and opposed the Manchus. Along with this, Hung Hei-gun also took refuge there, where he trained under Jee Sin Sim See. Eventually, Hung Hei-gun became Jee Sin Sim See's number one student.

That said, legend has it that Jee Sin Sim See also taught four others, whom in their entirety became the founding fathers of the five southern Shaolin styles: Hung Ga, Choy Ga, Mok Ga, Li Ga and Lau Ga.  Luk Ah-choi was one of these students.

Because the character "Hung" was used in the reign name of the emperor who overthrew the Mongol Yuan Dynasty to establish the Han Chinese Ming Dynasty, opponents of the Manchu Qing Dynasty made frequent use of the character in their imagery.
(Ironically, Luk Ah-choi 陸阿采 was the son of a Manchu stationed in Guangdong.)
Hung Hei-gun is itself an assumed name intended to honor that first Ming Emperor.
Anti-Qing rebels named the most far reaching of the secret societies they formed the "Hung Mun".

The Hung Mun claimed to be founded by survivors of the destruction of the Shaolin Temple, and the martial arts its members practiced came to be called "Hung Ga" and "Hung Kuen".

Its popularity in modern times is mainly associated with the Cantonese folk hero Wong Fei-hung, a Hung Ga master.

The Hung Ga curriculum of Wong Fei-hung
The Hung Ga curriculum that Wong Fei-hung learned from his father consisted of 
Single Hard Fist, Double Hard Fist, Taming the Tiger Fist, Black Tiger Fist, Angry Tiger Fist, and Arhat Fist,
Fifth Brother Eight Trigram Pole, Mother & Son Butterfly Swords, and the
Flying Hook.

Wong distilled his father's empty-hand material along with the material he learned from other masters into the "pillars" of Hung Ga, four empty-hand routines that constitute the core of Hung Ga instruction in the Wong Fei-hung lineage: Taming the Tiger Fist, Tiger Crane Paired Form Fist, Five Animal Fist, and Iron Wire Fist. Each of those routines is described in the sections below.

"工" Taming the Tiger Fist 工字伏虎拳
 pinyin: gōng zì fú hǔ quán; Yale Cantonese: gung ji fuk fu kuen.

The long routine Taming the Tiger trains the student in the basic techniques of Hung Ga while building endurance. It is said to go at least as far back as Jee Sin Sim See, who is said to have taught Taming the Tiger—or at least an early version of it—to both Hung Hei-gun and Luk Ah-choi.

The "工" Character in Taming the Tiger Fist is so called because its footwork traces a path resembling the character "工".

Tiger Crane Paired Form Fist 虎鶴雙形拳
 pinyin: hǔ hè shuāng xíng quán; Yale Cantonese: fu hok seung ying kuen.

Tiger Crane builds on Taming the Tiger, adding "vocabulary" to the Hung Ga practitioner's repertoire. Wong Fei-hung choreographed the version of Tiger Crane handed down in the lineages that descend from him. He is said to have added to Tiger Crane the bridge hand techniques and rooting of the master Tit Kiu Saam as well as long arm techniques, attributed variously to the Fat Ga, Lo Hon, and Lama styles. Tiger Crane Paired Form routines from outside Wong Fei-hung Hung Ga still exist.

Five Animal Fist 五形拳 / Five Animal Five Element Fist 五形五行拳
 pinyin: wǔ xíng quán; Yale Cantonese: ng ying keun / pinyin: wǔ xíng wǔ háng quán; Yale Cantonese: ng ying ng haang keun; Ng Ying Kungfu, Five Animal Kung Fu

This routine serve as a bridge between the external force of Tiger Crane and the internal focus of Iron Wire. "Five Animals" (literally "Five Forms") refers to the characteristic Five Animals of the Southern Chinese martial arts: Dragon, Snake, Tiger, Leopard, and Crane. "Five Elements" refers to the five classical Chinese elements: Earth, Water, Fire, Metal, and Wood.
The Hung Ga Five Animal Fist was choreographed by Wong Fei-hung and expanded by Lam Sai-wing, a senior student and teaching assistant of Wong Fei-hung, into the Five Animal Five Element Fist (also called the "Ten Form Fist"). In the Lam Sai-wing branch of Hung Ga, the Five Animal Five Element Fist has largely, but not entirely, superseded the Five Animal Fist, which has become associated with Dang Fong and others who were not around when the Five Animal Five Element Fist was modified.

Iron Wire Fist 鐵線拳
 pinyin: tiě xiàn quán; Yale Cantonese: Tit Sin Keun.

Iron Wire builds internal power and is attributed to the martial arts master Leung Kwan (1815–1887), better known as Tit Kiuh-saam. Like Wong Fei-hng's father Wong Kei-Ying, Tit Sin-saam was one of the Ten Tigers of Canton. As a teenager, Wong Fei Hung learned Iron Wire from Lam Fuk-sing
a student of Tit Sin-saam.  The routine has been enhanced and thus lengthened by his students.  The Iron Wire form is essentially a combination of Hei Gung or meditative breathing with isometric exercise, particularly dynamic tension, although weights were also used in traditional practice in the form of iron rings worn on the wrists.  If properly practiced, it can increase strength considerably and promote a stable root.  However, as with both most forms of qigong and most forms of isometric exercise, it must be practiced regularly or the benefits are quickly lost.

Wong Fei-hung weapon of choice was primarily the  Fifth Brother Eight Trigram Pole, which is a very popular routine in southern styles as its origins is linked to a famous patriot hero. The Mother & Son Butterfly Swords is also a primary weapon found in all Southern styles.   Other weapons credited to having been taught in Wong Fei-hung curriculum were the Spring & Autumn Guandao, and the Yu Family Tiger Fork broadsword, the spear, the fan.   Experiences of generations of practitioners has seen the curriculum grow extensively in all areas.

Branches of Hung Kuen
The curricula of different branches of Hung Ga differ tremendously with regard to routines and the selection of weapons, even within the Wong Fei-hung lineage.
Just as those branches that do not descend from Lam Sai-wing do not practice the 

Five Animal Five Element Fist.   Those branches that do not descend from Wong Fei-hung, are sometimes called "old Hung Kuen" or "village" Hung Kuen, do not practice the routines he choreographed, nor do the branches that do not descend from Tit Kiu Saam practice Iron Wire.
Conversely, the curricula of some branches have grown through the addition of further routines by creation or acquisition.

Nevertheless, the various branches of the Wong Fei-hung lineage still share the Hung Ga foundation he systematized. Lacking such a common point of reference, the "village" styles of Hung Kuen show even greater variation.

The curriculum which Jee Sin Sim See taught Hung Hei-gun is said to have comprised Tiger style, Luohan style, and Taming the Tiger routine.
Exchanging material with other martial artists allowed Hung to develop or acquire 
Tiger Crane Paired Form routine, a combination animal routine, Southern Flower Fist, and several weapons.

According to Hung Ga tradition, the martial arts that Jee Sin Sim See originally taught Hung Hei-gun were short range and the more active footwork, wider stances, and long range techniques commonly associated with Hung Ga were added later.  It is said to have featured "a two-foot horse," that is, narrow stances, and routines whose footwork typically took up no more than four tiles' worth of space.

Hasayfu Hung Ga 下四虎洪家
The Ha Sei Fu  is said to fit this description, though the implied link to the legendary Jee Sin Sim See is more speculative than most because of its poorly documented genealogy.
The Hasayfu Hung Kuen of Leung Wah-chew is a Five Animal style with a separate routine for each animal. Other Branches of Hasayfu Hung Kuen also contain combined animal sets, like Tiger & Crane, Dragon & Leopard, etc.

Five-Pattern Hung Kuen 五形洪拳
Similar to Ha Sei Fu Hung Ga, the Ng Ying Hung Kuen fits the description of Jee Sin Sim See's martial arts, but traces its ancestry to Ng Mui and Miu Hin who, like Jee Sin Sim See, were both survivors of the destruction of the Shaolin Monastery.
From Miu Hin, the Five-Pattern Hung Kuen passed to his daughter Miu Tsui-fa, and from his daughter to his grandson Fong Sai-yuk, both Chinese folk heroes like Jee Sin Sim See, Ng Mui, and their forebear Miu Hin.
Yuen Yik-kai's books introduced this branch to the Western/European venue. while conventionally translated as "Five-Pattern Hung Fist" rather than "Five Animal Hung Fist", it is a Five-Animal style, one with a single routine for all Five Animals but also has other sets as well.

Tiger Crane Paired Form 虎鶴雙形
The Tiger-Crane Combination style has been found in almost every Hung style.  While not as long as the Wong Fei-hung version, it is typically seen as containing 108 movements/techniques.

Ang Lian-huat attributes the art to Hung Hei-gun's combination of the Tiger style he learned from Jee Sin Sim See with the Crane style he learned from his wife, whose name is given in Hokkien as Tee Eng-choon.  Like other martial arts that trace their origins to Fujian (e.g. Fujian White Crane, Five Ancestors), this style uses San Chian as its foundation.

Wong Kiew-kit trace their version of the Tiger Crane routine, not to Hung Hei-gun or Luk Ah-choi, but to their senior classmate Harng Yein.

Northern Hung Kuen 洪拳
There are northern styles that use the name "Hung Kuen" (洪拳; pinyin: hóng quán), though these predate the Qing Dynasty (1644–1912).  Other northern styles use the character for "Red Fist".

The dissemination of Hung Kuen

The dissemination of Hung Kuen in Southern China, and its Guangdong and Fujian Provinces in particular, is due to the concentration of anti-Qing activity there.
The Hung Mun began life in the 1760s as the Heaven and Earth Society, whose founders came from the prefecture of Zhangzhou in Fujian Province, on its border with Guangdong, where one of its founders organized a precursor to the Heaven and Earth Society in Huizhou.
Guangdong and Fujian remained a stronghold of sympathizers and recruits for the Hung Mun, even as it spread elsewhere in the decades that followed.
Though the members of the Hung Clan almost certainly practiced a variety of martial arts styles, the composition of its membership meant that it was the characteristics of Fujianese and Cantonese martial arts that came to be associated with the names "Hung Kuen" and "Hung Ga".
Regardless of their differences, the Hung Kuen lineages of Wong Fei-hung, Yuen Yik-kai, Leung Wah-chew, and Jeung Kei-ji nonetheless all trace their origins to this area and this time period, are all Five Animal styles, and all claim Shaolin origins.
Northern Hung Kuen, by contrast, is not a Five Animal style and dates to the 16th century.
Cantonese and Fujianese are also predominant among Overseas Chinese, accounting for the widespread dissemination of Hung Kuen outside of China.

Wong Fei-Hung Lineages

Lam Sai-wing’s Lineage mainly descends from Wong Fei-hung.  

- Chan Hon-chung, who was very famous in Hong Kong and represented what was best in his generation of masters. He held incredible knowledge and had the full Hung Kuen system passed down from Lam Sai-wing.  In 1938, he established the Chan Hon Chung Gymnasium to teach Hung Gar (Hung Family) kung fu. At the same time he had a chiropractic clinic.In 1970, he formed The Hong Kong Chinese Martial Arts Association with the intention of  coordinating and promoting Chinese martial arts in Hong Kong, and held the position of chairman for many years.

- Lau Jaam Hung Kuen (劉湛家傳) family lineage (Learn From Lam Sai-wing). One of the more-famous teachers of Hung Kuen today was the Shaw Brothers movie director/actor, Lau Kar-leung, who has many students in Hong Kong. One of Lau Kar-leung's notable disciples is Mark Ho (Ho Mai, 何麥), also known as Mark Houghton, an Englishman who has lived in Hong Kong for 20 years. Mark Ho, with the blessing of Lau Kar-leung, has opened a unique Hung Kuen school in Fanling. The school itself looks like a scene from a Shaw Brothers movie; it has many training chambers, wooden dummies, and hanging logs. There are now Lau Family Hung Kuen schools in China and England.   Lau Kar-yung / Lau Ga-yung (劉家勇) He is the grandson of [Lau Cham (劉湛) (Lau Jaam)]]. Kar-yung is the son of Lau Cham's (劉湛) second daughter Lau Shiu-yee and His uncle is Lau Kar-leung and also he is Lau Kar-wing’s nephew. Kar-yung was followed by Lau Shiu-yee (Mother) to learn Lau’s Family Hung Ga kung fu and, Chinese herbal medicine at Lau cham’s martial arts school in Hong Kong. Then he becomes a member of the Lau Kar Ban (Liu Jiaban) / Lau’s brothers and making some of the best Kung Fu Movie ever seen. After 50 years of training and profession, he is currently the Grandmaster of Lau’s family Hung Kuen Branch and he continues spreading his family lineage across the globe. Also, become President of Hung Gar Association Lau Kar Yung Hung Kuen Kung Fu Association. Additional Lau's family disciples were added for the 6th generation apprentice, representing Germany: Master Jau-chi Hang, Mexico: Master James Valentino Santi, and United States: Master Chun Ho and Grandmaster Lau Kar-yung. 

- Lam Cho (Lam Sai-wing's adopted nephew) was an icon in the Hong Kong martial arts scene.   He succeeded in successful innovations and creative additions of various Hand and Weapon Routines.  Lam Cho has taught many well known masters that now have students around the world.  -  Y.C. Wong (San Francisco),  Bucksam Kong (Los Angeles and Hawaii), Kwong Tit-fu and Tang Kwok-wah (Boston) . Lam Cho's children, Anthony Lam Chun-fai, and Lam Chun-sing, now carry on his Hung Ga teaching in Hong Kong. Anthony Lam Chun-fai, his eldest son, has also done much to spread Hung Kuen in Europe, while Simon Lam Chun-chung, his third son, continues to teach his father's students and new students at Lam Cho's renowned studio in Mong Kok, Hong Kong.

(Among Tang Kwok-wah's students currently teaching in the area are Winchell Ping Chiu-woo (Chiu Mo Kwoon, Boston), Yon Lee (who is also the master instructor for the Harvard Tai Chi Tiger Crane kung fu Club at Harvard University since 1985), and Sik Y. Hum. Calvin Chin of Newton Highlands, Massachusetts, carries on Kwong's legacy.) 

- Chiu Kau began learning Hung Kuen in Singapore then became a student of Lam Sai-wing.   He later married Wong Siu-ying, who began learning Hung Ga from her husband. The couple eventually settled down in Hong Kong, where they continued their Hung Ga training at the Lam Sai-wing National Art Association Second Branch. Their sons Chiu Chi-ling of Alameda, California, and Chiu Wai of Calgary, Alberta, Canada are the inheritors of this lineage. Kwong-wing Lam (Lam Kwong-wing, 林光榮) of Sunnyvale, California, studied with Chiu Kau, Chiu Wai, and Lam Jo, and learned the Ha Sei Fu style of Hung Ga from Leung Wah-chew. In Hong Kong, the original Chiu Wai Hung Kuen school continues under the teaching of Chiu Wah, and in 1998 another branch was established in Hong Kong under the teaching of Gam Bok-yin.

Dang Fong lineage students consists of such notables as: Ho Lap Tien - Represented in the U.S. by Philadelphia's Master Cheurng Shu Pui.(),  Yuen Ling - Represented in the U.S. by Master Frank Yee (Yee Chi-wai), Lau Kai Ton - Represented in the U.S. by New Mexico's Master Frank Rivera., Luk Gan Wing - Represented in Ontario, Canada by his son., Cheung Tai Hing - Represented in the U.S. by New York's Master Wan Chi Ming., Jao/Chow Wing Duk - Represented in Spain by Master Lam Chuen Ping , Wong Jo, Kwan Kei Tin & Won Lei

In media
 Hung Ga inspired the main basis of earthbending on the Nickelodeon animated show Avatar: The Last Airbender and its sequel series The Legend of Korra.
 The humble tailor of Pigsty Alley used Hung Ga on Kung Fu Hustle.
 Shang Chi and the Legend of the Ten Rings features Wenwu, the MCU's version of the Mandarin using a style similar to Hung Ga.
 Po and The Furious Five use the Five Animal Styles of Hung Ga on the Dreamworks films Kung Fu Panda, Secrets of the Furious Five, Kung Fu Panda 2, Kung Fu Panda 3, and Kung Fu Panda: Secrets of the Scroll as well as the TV series Kung Fu Panda: Legends of Awesomeness. Po also used it on Kung Fu Panda: The Paws of Destiny and Kung Fu Panda: The Dragon Knight. 
 Tony Jaa includes Hung Gar in his fighting style when playing Tien on Ong-Bak 2, and Ong-Bak 3, prequels to Ong-Bak. 
 Sammo Hung use Hung Ga when playing Hung Chun-nam on Ip Man 2.
 Chu-Ying (Kara Hui), Mai Chen-Huo (Hsiao Ho), Master Shan (Wang Lung-wei), Wong Fei-hung (Gordon Liu), and Wong Kei-ying (Ku Feng) use Hung Ga on Martial Club.
 Jet Li use Hung Ga as Huo Yuanjia on Fearless. 
 Lau Ga-yung (Lau Kar Yung) uses Hung Ga as Master Hong on The Grandmaster.

See also
 The five major family styles of southern Chinese martial arts
 Jee Sin Sim See
 Wong Kei-ying
 Wong Fei-hung
 Lam Sai-wing
 Tang Fung
 Fu Jow Pai - Tiger Claw System
 Cantonese culture
 Hak Fu Mun - Black Tiger System

References

 Sources
 
 Rene Ritchie, Robert Chu and Hendrik Santo. 
 
 Hagen Bluck "Hung Gar Kuen - Im Zeichen des Tigers und des Kranichs"; 1998/2006 MV-Verlag, Edition Octopus, 
 Lam Sai-wing.  Second Edition, 2007. Paperback, 188 pages.    / Original edition: Hong Kong, 1957; translated from Chinese in 2002 - 2007

Chinese martial arts
Chinese swordsmanship
Guangdong Nanquan
Buddhist martial arts